Alexandrina Henderson Farmer Jay, OBE (born 25 April 1949) is a British academic. She is visiting professor at the University of Strathclyde and the independent chair of the Centre for Excellence for Children's Care and Protection (CELCIS).

Following the resignation of Justice Lowell Goddard, Home Secretary Amber Rudd announced on 11 August 2016 that Jay had been appointed to chair the Independent Inquiry into Child Sexual Abuse, of which she had previously been a Panel member.

Jay is a former senior social worker. She was previously chief social work adviser to the Scottish Government and a former president of the Association of Directors of Social Work.

Early life
Jay was born in Edinburgh. Her father, who was a carpenter, died following an industrial accident when she was two. She studied social work at Moray House School of Education, now part of the University of Edinburgh.

Career
In 2005, she took up the post of chief social work inspector at the Social Work Inspection Agency (SWIA), a government organisation scrutinising all aspects of social services provided by local authorities in Scotland. She served as chief executive and chief social work inspector until the functions of SWIA and the Care Commission were taken over by the Care Inspectorate in 2011. She remained as chief social work inspector to the Scottish Government until early 2013.

Expert role in independent inquiries
She led the Independent Inquiry into Child Sexual Exploitation in Rotherham, an investigation into child sexual abuse in the Metropolitan Borough of Rotherham in South Yorkshire. She is the author of the investigation's report, published in August 2014.

In September 2014 she was appointed to act as an expert adviser to an independent panel inquiry which was intended to examine how the UK's institutions have handled their duties to protect children from sexual abuse. Following the abandonment of the initial panel inquiry in favour of a statutory inquiry, she was re-appointed as an adviser to the subsequent Independent Inquiry into Child Sexual Abuse chaired by Dame Lowell Goddard.  After Goddard resigned as chair, it was announced on 11 August 2016 that Jay had been appointed to chair the Inquiry,

Honours
She was made an Officer of the Order of the British Empire in 2012.

References 

1949 births
Alumni of the University of Edinburgh
Academics from Edinburgh
British social workers
Officers of the Order of the British Empire
Civil servants from Edinburgh
Politics of Rotherham
Living people